Vladimir Lebedev may refer to:

Vladimir Lebedev (artist) (1891–1967), Soviet painter and graphic artist
Vladimir Lebedev (skier) (born 1984), Russian freestyle skier